The 2020 Toronto FC II season is the sixth season in the club's history. Having previously competed in the USL, this would have been the club's second season in USL League One (USL1), the third tier of professional soccer in the United States. On July 8, 2020, the team announced they would not play in the 2020 USL1 season because of COVID-19 restrictions. They plan to return for the 2021 season.

Roster

|}

Out on loan

References

Toronto FC II seasons
Toronto FC II
Toronto FC II
Toronto FC II